The 9.3×57mm was created by necking up the 7.92×57mm Mauser cartridge. The 9.3×57mm (bullet diameter .365 in.), introduced in 1900, is closely related to the 9×57mm Mauser, even though some dimensions of the cartridge case are slightly different. The 9.3×57mm is still fairly popular among moose hunters in Scandinavia (among hunters in Sweden it is affectionately known as "potatiskastaren", the spud gun, because of the slow and heavy bullet).

Usage
It is used for hunting wild boar and elk in Scandinavia.  The 9.3 mm bullets (.366" diameter) loaded in this cartridge come in 232 and 286 grain weights.

Reloading

Cartridges of the World  lists reloading information for both the 232 and 286gr bullets using IMR3031 powder as well as showing a Norma factory load.

The loads listed in Cartridges of the World are valid, but dated.  The loading information has not been updated to reflect newer powders than IMR 3031.

References

Pistol and rifle cartridges